Hatful of Rain (The Best of Del Amitri) is the first compilation album by Scottish alternative rock band Del Amitri, released in September 1998 by A&M Records.  It consists of all the band's British singles released between 1989 and 1998, including the non-album singles "Spit in the Rain" and "Don't Come Home Too Soon", and a new track "Cry to Be Found".

Trivia 
The single "Don't Come Home Too Soon" was the Official Team Scotland Song for the 1998 FIFA World Cup.

Critical reception 

AllMusic's Stephen Thomas Erlewine called Hatful of Rain "an excellent overview of Del Amitri's career", writing, "It may overlook their early independent singles, yet the consistency of their major-label work in the '80s and '90s gives the collection a sense of cohesion, even if it is sequenced out of chronological order. What matters is that Hatful of Rain contains everything that a casual fan could want while reconfirming their stature as a solid singles band to their core constituents."

Track listing
All songs written by Justin Currie, except where noted.

Special edition bonus CD

Personnel
Credits adapted from the album liner notes.

Del Amitri
Justin Currie – vocals, bass
Iain Harvie – guitar
Kris Dollimore – guitar
Andy Alston – keyboards
Mark Price – drums
Mick Slaven – guitar (3, 12, 14), mandolin (5)
David Cummings – guitar (2, 6-11)
Jon McLoughlin – guitar (4, 16)
Paul Tyagi – drums (14), percussion (3, 5)
Brian McDermott – drums (6, 8-10, 15)
Chris Sharrock – drums (2, 7, 11)
Ash Soan – drums (4, 16)
Additional musicians
David McCluskey – hammered dulcimer (9), bodhrán (13)
Bobsy Mullen – bagpipe chanter (9)
Nick Clark – bass (10)
Technical
Kevin Bacon – producer (1)
Jonathan Quarmby – producer (1)
Al Clay – producer (2, 7, 11, 13), engineer (2, 7, 9, 11, 13)
Mark Freegard – producer, engineer (3, 4, 12, 16), additional recording (5, 14)
Hugh Jones – producer, engineer (5)
Gil Norton – producer, engineer (6, 8-10, 14, 15)
Pete Smith – producer (17), engineer, mixing (live at Abbey Road)
Ben Darlow – engineer (17, live at Abbey Road)
Bob Clearmountain – mixing (2, 7, 11, 13)
Julian Mendelsohn – mixing (3, 5, 12, 14)
David Bianco – mixing (4, 16)
Dave Bascombe – mixing (6)
Jonathan Glynn-Smith – photography
Peacock – design

Charts

Certifications

External links
Official Del Amitri homepage

Notes

Del Amitri albums
1998 greatest hits albums
A&M Records compilation albums